The Freberg Rocks are a small group of rocks lying off Rocky Bay,  west-northwest of Ducloz Head, South Georgia. They were surveyed by the South Georgia Survey in the period 1951–57, and were named by the UK Antarctic Place-Names Committee for Hjalmar Freberg, a gunner of the Tonsberg Hvalfangeri, Husvik, 1946–54.

References

Rock formations of Antarctica